The Santa Rosa Pirates were a minor league baseball team, located in Santa Rosa, California from 1948–1949. The team was originally an affiliate of the Pittsburgh Pirates in 1948, winning the Far West League title. In 1949 the team was without an affiliate and played as the Santa Rosa Cats. After posting a 43-49 record in 1949, the Cats disbanded on August 4, 1949.

Season-by-season

Baseball teams established in 1948
Baseball teams disestablished in 1949
Defunct minor league baseball teams
Defunct baseball teams in California
Professional baseball teams in California
Pittsburgh Pirates minor league affiliates
1948 establishments in California
1949 disestablishments in California
Sports in Santa Rosa, California
Far West League teams